Lycium is a genus of flowering plants in the nightshade family, Solanaceae. The genus has a disjunct distribution around the globe, with species occurring on most continents in temperate and subtropical regions. South America has the most species, followed by North America and southern Africa. There are several scattered across Europe and Asia, and one is native to Australia. Common English names for plants of this genus include box-thorn and desert-thorn.

There are about 70 to 80 species.  The most common are Lycium barbarum and Lycium chinense, whose fruits (wolfberries or goji berries) are a traditional food crop in China.

Etymology

The generic name Lycium is derived from the Greek word λυκιον (lykion), which was applied by Pliny the Elder (23-79) and Pedanius Dioscorides (ca. 40-90) to a plant known as dyer's buckthorn. It was probably a Rhamnus species and was named for Lycia (Λυκία), the ancient southern Anatolian region in which it grew.  The berry is called lycii fructus ("lycium fruit") in old Latin pharmacological texts.

Description

Lycium are shrubs, often thorny, growing 1 to 4 meters tall. The leaves are small, narrow, and fleshy, and are alternately arranged, sometimes in fascicles. Flowers are solitary or borne in clusters. The funnel-shaped or bell-shaped corolla is white, green, or purple in color. The fruit is a two-chambered, usually fleshy and juicy  berry which can be red, orange, yellow, or black. It may have few seeds or many. Most Lycium have fleshy, red berries with over 10 seeds, but a few American taxa have hard fruits with two seeds.

While most Lycium are monoecious, producing bisexual flowers with functional male and female parts, some species are gynodioecious, with some individuals bearing bisexual flowers and some producing functionally female flowers.

Uses
Lycium has been known to European herbalists since ancient times, and species were traded from the Far East to Europe by the Romans, for example via Ariaca and the port of Barbarikon near today's Karachi, as mentioned in the Periplus of the Erythraean Sea. In his Naturalis historia, Pliny the Elder describes boxthorn as a medicinal plant, as does Pedanius Dioscorides in his P. Dioscoridae pharmacorum simplicium reique medicae.

In his 1753 publication Species Plantarum, Linnaeus describes three Lycium species: L. afrum, L. barbarum, and L. europaeum.

Lycium, particularly L. barbarum, have long been used in traditional Chinese medicine. The leaves and roots of other species of Lycium, such as L. europaeum, when mixed with water, have been used in folk medicine. The fruit of L. barbatum and L. chinense, known as goji berry, is commonly consumed as a dried fruit. The Chinese tonic gou qi zi ("wolfberry fruit") is made of the fruit of any of several Lycium species, and is used as a dietary supplement.

Ecology
Lycium species mostly occur in arid and semi-arid climates, and a few are known from coastal zones in somewhat saline habitat types.

Invasive species include L. ferocissimum, which was introduced to Australia and New Zealand and has become a dense, thorny pest plant there. It injures livestock, harbors pest mammals and insects, and displaces native species.

Selected species

Species include:

 Lycium acutifolium
 Lycium afrum L. – Kraal honey thorn
 Lycium ameghinoi
 Lycium amoenum
 Lycium andersonii – Anderson boxthorn, water-jacket
 Lycium arenicola
 Lycium australe F.Muell.
 Lycium barbarum – Barbary matrimony-vine, Chinese boxthorn, Duke of Argyll's teaplant, goji-berry, Himalayan goji, Tibetan goji
 Lycium bosciifolium
 Lycium berlandieri Dunal – Berlandier wolfberry
 Lycium brevipes – Baja desert-thorn
 Lycium californicum – California boxthorn, California desert-thorn
 Lycium carolinianum Walter – Carolina desert-thorn, Christmas berry
 Lycium chilense Bertero
 Lycium chinense – Chinese teaplant, Chinese wolfberry, Chinese boxthorn
 Lycium cinereum – Kriedoring
 Lycium cooperi – peachthorn, Cooper's wolfberry
 Lycium decumbens
 Lycium depressum Stocks
 Lycium eenii
 Lycium europaeum L. – European teatree, European matrimony-vine
 Lycium exsertum A.Gray – Arizona desert-thorn, littleleaf wolfberry
 Lycium ferocissimum – African boxthorn
 Lycium fremontii – Frémont's desert-thorn
 Lycium gariepense
 Lycium grandicalyx
Lycium hassei – Santa Catalina Island desert-thorn
 Lycium horridum
 Lycium hirsutum
 Lycium intricatum
 Lycium macrodon A.Gray – desert wolfberry
 Lycium mascarenense A.M. Venter & A.J. Scott (syn. L. tenue var. sieberi)
 Lycium nodosum
 Lycium oxycarpum Dunal
 Lycium pallidum Miers – pale desert-thorn
Lycium parishii – Parish's desert-thorn
 Lycium pilifolium
Lycium puberulum – downy desert-thorn
 Lycium pumilum
 Lycium ruthenicum Murray
Lycium savory D. Jacobson – South America
 Lycium sandwicense A.Gray – Ōhelo kai, Hawaii desert-thorn
 Lycium schizocalyx
 Lycium schweinfurthii
 Lycium shawii Roem. & Schult. – Arabian boxthorn
Lycium shockleyi – Shockley's desert-thorn
 Lycium sokotranum
 Lycium strandveldense
 Lycium tenue L.
 Lycium tenuispinosum
 Lycium tetrandrum
Lycium texanum – Texas wolfberry
 Lycium torreyi – Torrey's boxthorn, squawthorn
Lycium tweedianum – tropical desert-thorn
 Lycium villosum 
Lycium savory D. Jacobson – South America

Formerly placed here
Serissa japonica (Thunb.) Thunb. (as L. foetidum L.f. or L. japonicum Thunb.)

References

External links

Project Lycieae, Amherst College

 
Solanaceae genera